Ricanstruction: The Black Rosary is the fourth studio album by rapper Chino XL. It was released on September 25, 2012. The album won the 2012 HHUG Album of the Year award

Track listing

Disc 1
Scalpel Disc

Disk 2
Chapel Disk

References

Chino XL albums
Albums produced by Apollo Brown